This is a list of participants in the television series Skal vi danse?, the Norwegian version of Strictly Come Dancing.

Participants 

 Ben Adams
 Simen Agdestein
 Lene Alexandra
 Elisabeth Andreassen
 Anna Anka
 Ellen Arnstad
 Marianne Aulie
 Esben Esther Pirelli Benestad
 Susann Goksør Bjerkrheim
 Lars Bohinen
 Hans Petter Buraas
 Tone Damli
 Dina (musician)
 Tor Endresen
 Åsleik Engmark
 Signy Fardal
 Hallvard Flatland
 Andrine Flemmen
 Tore André Flo
 Mikkel Gaup
 Geir Gundersen
 Einar Gelius
 Jarl Goli
 Mona Grudt
 Carl I. Hagen
 Eli Hagen
 Inger Lise Hansen
 Pia Haraldsen
 Trine Hattestad
 Stig Henrik Hoff
 Triana Iglesias
 Anders Jacobsen (ski jumper)
 Finn Christian Jagge
 Linda Johansen
 Agnete Johnsen
 Tobias Karlsson (figure skater)
 Nadya Khamitskaya
 Ole Klemetsen
 Venke Knutson
 Hanne Krogh
 Cathrine Larsåsen
 Rune Larsen
 Dag Otto Lauritzen
 Olivia Lewis
 Aylar Lie
 Mari Maurstad
 Linni Meister
 Marit Mikkelsplass
 Anita Moen
 Katrine Moholt
 Trude Mostue
 Noman Mubashir
 Lillian Müller
 Stella Mwangi
 Eirik Newth
 Kristian Ødegård
 Gaute Ormåsen
 Lasse Ottesen
 Cato Zahl Pedersen
 Jostein Pedersen
 Atle Pettersen
 Margrethe Røed
 Vebjørn Sand
 Guri Schanke
 Jenny Skavlan
 Cecilie Skog
 Guri Solberg
 Kathrine Sørland
 Hanne Sørvaag
 Maria Haukaas Mittet
 Roar Strand
 Steffen Tangstad
 Kari Traa
 Pål Anders Ullevålseter
 Eldar Vågan
 Anita Valen

Skal vi danse?
Skal vi danse?
Skal vi danse